Polymixis argillaceago is a moth of the family Noctuidae. It is found in south-western Europe and the Maghreb countries.

The wingspan is 34–39 mm. Adults are on wing from September to October in one generation per year.

The larvae feed on various herbaceous plants. Young larvae are green with a conspicuous whitish stripe at the side. After the fifth instar, they turn brown. The species overwinters in the larval stage.

References

External links

Lepiforum.de
Lépidoptères de France méridionale et de Corse 

Moths described in 1822
Cuculliinae
Moths of Europe
Taxa named by Jacob Hübner